Priidu Aavik (22 April 1905 – 22 April 1991) was an Estonian painter.

He was born in Novgorod, Russian Empire.

He died in Tallinn.

References

1905 births
1991 deaths
People from Veliky Novgorod
People from Novgorodsky Uyezd
Soviet painters
Soviet military personnel of World War II